Ånge Municipality (Ånge kommun) is a municipality in Västernorrland County, northern Sweden. Its seat is located in Ånge.

The railway junction Ånge was in 1947 made a market town (köping) and detached from Borgsjö. In 1971 they were reunited and together with Haverö and Torp the present municipality was formed.

The municipal most known slogan is Sweden's geographical center. It was in 1947 measured by the Royal Institute of Technology to be situated by the lake Munkbysjön (Lake Munkby), in the municipality's eastern parts. In 2002 the slogan was changed to Wonderful byways.

13 kilometers east of the town Ånge lies the town Borgsjö. It has a widely acclaimed rococo church from the 18th century.

Localities 
 Alby
 Fränsta
 Ljungaverk
 Torpshammar
 Ånge (seat)
 Östavall

Sister cities 
Ånge's sister cities:
 Malvik, Norway;
 Oravais, Finland; 
 Ogre, Latvia;
 Beng, Laos.

The Nordic sister cities were established in the 1940s, the others not before 1990.

References

External links

Ånge - Official site

Municipalities of Västernorrland County